Bryant is an unincorporated community in Palm Beach County, Florida, United States. Bryant has a post office with ZIP code 33438.

U.S. Sugar operated the Bryant Sugar House mill in Bryant. The mill closed in 2007, while the town was taken over by the federal government in 2011 and demolished in 2016.

Overtime, Bryant would basically be treated like a northeastern suburb of Pahokee.

References

Gallery

Unincorporated communities in Palm Beach County, Florida
Unincorporated communities in Florida